The Little Pomahaka River is a river of New Zealand, a tributary of the Pomahaka River which it joins east of the Whitecoomb Range.

See also
List of rivers of New Zealand

References

Rivers of Otago
Rivers of New Zealand